Elissa is a feminine given name. It is derived from the Hebrew name Elisheba, which also is the root of Elizabeth

Closely related names include Alyssa, Elisa, and Eliza. Other spellings include Ellissa and Elyssa.

People 
 Dido, first Queen of Carthage, in some sources is referred to as Elissa
 Elissa (singer) (born 1971), birth name Elissar Khoury, Lebanese singer known by the mononym Elissa
 Elissa Aalto (1922–1994), Finnish architect and author
 Elissa Alarie (born 1986), Canadian rugby player
 Elissa P. Benedek (born 1936), American clinical psychiatrist and professor
 Elissa Blount Moorhead, American artist and writer
 Elissa Cameron, New Zealand wildlife biologist
 Elissa Cunane (born 2000), American basketball player
 Elissa Down, Australian filmmaker
 Ellie Downie (born 1999), British gymnast, born Elissa Downie
 Elissa Hallem, American neurobiologist
 Elissa Landi (1904–1948), Italian actress
 Elissa Lansdell, Canadian television host
 Elissa Murphy, American software engineer and executive
 Elissa McCracken, American beauty pageant competitor
 Elissa Mielke, Canadian singer and model
 Elissa L. Newport, American psycholinguist and professor
 Elissa Schappell, American writer
 Elissa Shevinsky, American executive and writer
 Elissa Silverman (born  1973), American politician
 Elissa Steamer (born 1975), American professional skateboarder
 Elissa Wall (born 1986), American writer
 Elissa Washuta, American Indian writer

See also
Alyssa
Elisa (given name)
Elisha
Eliza (given name)

References

Feminine given names
Given names of Hebrew language origin